
Police County is a unit of territorial administration and local government (powiat) in West Pomeranian Voivodeship, north-western Poland, on the Polish-German border. It came into being on January 1, 1999, as a result of the Polish local government reforms passed in 1998.

As of 2006 its total population is 64,147, out of which the population of Police is 34,284, that of Nowe Warpno is 1,170 and the rural population is 28,693.

Neighbouring counties

Police County is bordered by the city of Świnoujście (across the Szczecin Lagoon) to the north, and by Goleniów County, the city of Szczecin and Gryfino County to the east. It also borders Germany to the west (districts Vorpommern-Greifswald and Uckermark).

There is a common bus transport system in Police and Szczecin.

Police County has road connections with:
Szczecin (Poland), A6 Motorway and roads No. 10, 13 and 115
Pasewalk in Vorpommern-Greifswald (Germany), road No. 10
Goleniów (Poland), Penkun in Uckermark and Berlin (Germany), A6 Motorway

Administrative division
The county is subdivided into four gminas (two urban-rural and two rural). These are listed in the following table, in descending order of population.

Nature, sights, tourist attractions and accommodation base
The Wkrzanska Forest - Natura 2000 area; in the area of Świdwie Nature Reserve ("Swidwie" Sanctuary, Świdwie Lake near Tanowo and Dobra)
Police - Canals - Natura 2000 area; ruins of the synthetic petrol plant (Hydrierwerke Pölitz – Aktiengeselschaft) in Police are a habitat of bats (barbastelle, greater mouse-eared bat, Daubenton's Bat, Natterer's bat, brown long-eared bat). 
Kayak-way on Gunica River from Węgornik through Tanowo, Tatynia and Wieńkowo to Police (Jasienica)
The Szczecin Lagoon in the area of Police (Trzebież, Nowe Warpno)

Historical buildings in the area include:
Brick Gothic Church in Police - Jasienica (14th/18th century) 
Ruin of Augustinians' cloister in Police - Jasienica (14th century)
Brick Gothic Chapel (15th century) in The Chrobry Square in the Police Old Town 
Neo-Gothic Church (19th century) in the Police Old Town
The Police Lapidary in The Staromiejski Park in the Police Old Town
Tenement houses (19th century) in Police, Nowe Warpno and houses from this period in Trzebież
Town hall in Nowe Warpno (14th century)
Churches from 13th century in Kołbaskowo, Dobra, Wołczkowo, Buk, Wąwelnica, Mierzyn, Barnisław and Będargowo.

Accommodation facilities are consisted mainly of hotels in Police, Trzebież, Brzózki, Mierzyn, Lubieszyn, Przecław, Przęsocin and Ustowo (hostel and inn) and agritourism farms. e.g. in Rzędziny and Kołbaskowo. Accommodation base of Nowe Warpno is a resort, marina, camping, guest house and rooms in private homes.

References 
Polish official population figures 2006

Further reading 
Aischmann, Bernd: Mecklenburg-Vorpommern, die Stadt Stettin ausgenommen, Thomas Helms Verlag, Schwerin 2008. 

 
Police
1999 establishments in Poland
States and territories established in 1999